Guan Youfei (born 1957) is a rear admiral (shaojiang) of the People's Liberation Army Navy (PLAN) of China. He has been director of the Office for International Military Cooperation of the Central Military Commission since January 2016.

Biography
Guan Youfei was born in 1957 in Wuzhou, Guangxi. In 1975 he graduated from The High School Affiliated To Beijing Normal University. He was conscripted into military service in 1976, during the end of the Cultural Revolution. He served in various posts in the navy ship force before studying at Dalian Naval Academy. In 2008, he was appointed deputy director of the Ministry of National Defence Foreign Affairs Office, and five years later promoted to the Director position. Guan Youfei was promoted to the rank of rear admiral (shaojiang) in 2009. On January 15, 2016, he became director of the newly established Office for International Military Cooperation of the Central Military Commission , after China's reform of national defense and the army.

References

External links

1957 births
Living people
Dalian Naval Academy alumni
People's Republic of China politicians from Guangxi
Chinese Communist Party politicians from Guangxi
People's Liberation Army Navy admirals